Praven Jeram is an Indian-born former association football goalkeeper who represented New Zealand at international level.

Jeram represented New Zealand at under-20 level before making his full All Whites debut in a 1–2 loss to New Caledonia on 21 July 1971 and ended his international playing career with 9 A-international caps to his credit, his final cap also against New Caledonia, a 4–0 win on 8 March 1977.

References 

Living people
New Zealand association footballers
New Zealand international footballers
Association football goalkeepers
People from Navsari district
Indian emigrants to New Zealand
New Zealand sportspeople of Indian descent
1952 births